The 2009 Dallas Cup will be the 30th since its establishment, 12 teams entering in the tournament. The competition is sponsored by Dr Pepper.

Participating teams

From AFC:

  Urawa Red Diamonds

From CONCACAF:

  Toronto FC 
  Vancouver Whitecaps 
  UANL Tigres 
  Monterrey 
  Andromeda 
  Dallas Texans

From CONMEBOL:

  River Plate 
  São Paulo

From UEFA:

  Manchester City 
  Eintracht Frankfurt 
  Milan

Standings

Group A

Group B

Group C

Ranking of second-placed teams

Semifinal

Third place playoff

Championship

Top Scorer

External links 
 2009 Dr Pepper Dallas Cup XXX

2009
2009 in American soccer
Dallas Cup